Delevingne is a surname. Notable people with the surname include:

 Angela Delevingne (1912–2014), British aristocrat and socialite
 Lionel Delevingne, French-American photojournalist
 Malcolm Delevingne (1868–1950), British civil servant
 Charles Delevingne (born 1949), British property developer, father of Cara and Poppy
 Cara Delevingne (born 1992), British model, actress, singer and novelist
 Poppy Delevingne (born 1986), British model and actress
 Doris Castlerosse (née Delevingne; 1900–1942), British socialite

See also 

 Delavigne
 Lavine
 Levine
 Levinger

Surnames
Surnames of French origin
French-language surnames